Charles H. Morgan was an American football and basketball coach. He served two stints as the head football coach at Kansas State Teachers College of Pittsburg—now known as Pittsburg State University— in Pittsburg, Kansas, in 1936 and again from 1938 to 1948, compiling a record of 44–43–15.

Head coaching record

Football

References

Year of birth missing
Year of death missing
Pittsburg State Gorillas football coaches
Pittsburg State Gorillas men's basketball coaches